Thomas Merton  (January 31, 1915 – December 10, 1968) was an American Trappist monk, writer, theologian, mystic, poet, social activist and scholar of comparative religion. On May 26, 1949, he was ordained to the Catholic priesthood and given the name "Father Louis". He was a member of the Abbey of Our Lady of Gethsemani, near Bardstown, Kentucky, living there from 1941 to his death.

Merton wrote more than 50 books in a period of 27 years, mostly on spirituality, social justice and a quiet pacifism, as well as scores of essays and reviews. Among Merton's most enduring works is his bestselling autobiography The Seven Storey Mountain (1948). His account of his spiritual journey inspired scores of World War II veterans, students, and teenagers to explore offerings of monasteries across the US. It is on National Reviews list of the 100 best nonfiction books of the century.

Merton became a keen proponent of interfaith understanding, exploring Eastern religions through his study of mystic practice.  He is particularly known for having pioneered dialogue with prominent Asian spiritual figures, including the Dalai Lama; Japanese writer D. T. Suzuki; Thai Buddhist monk Buddhadasa, and Vietnamese monk Thich Nhat Hanh. He traveled extensively in the course of meeting with them and attending international conferences on religion. In addition, he wrote books on Zen Buddhism, Confucianism, and Taoism, and how Christianity related to them. This was highly unusual at the time in the United States, particularly within the religious orders.

Biography

Early life
Thomas Merton was born in Prades, Pyrénées-Orientales, France, on January 31, 1915, to parents of Welsh origin: Owen Merton, a New Zealand painter active in Europe and the United States, and Ruth Jenkins Merton, an American Quaker and artist. They had met at a painting school in Paris. He was baptized in the Church of England, in accordance with his father's wishes. Merton's father was often absent during his son's childhood.

During the First World War, in August 1915, the Merton family left France for the United States. They lived first with Ruth's parents in Queens, New York, and then settled near them in Douglaston. In 1917, the family moved into an old house in Flushing, Queens, where Merton's brother John Paul was born on November 2, 1918. The family was considering returning to France when Ruth was diagnosed with stomach cancer. She died from it on October 21, 1921, in Bellevue Hospital. Merton was six years old and his brother not yet three.

In 1926, when Merton was eleven, his father enrolled him in a boys' boarding school in Montauban, the Lycée Ingres. In the summer of 1928, he withdrew Merton from Lycée Ingres, saying the family was moving to England.

College
In October 1933, Merton, age 18, entered Clare College as an undergraduate to study Modern Languages (French and Italian).

In January 1935, Merton, age 20,  enrolled as a sophomore at Columbia University in Manhattan. There he established close and long-lasting friendships with Ad Reinhardt, who became known as a proto-minimalist painter, poet Robert Lax, commentator Ralph de Toledano, John Slate, who founded the international law firm Skadden Arps Slate Meagher & Flom and became his legal advisor, and Robert Giroux, founder of Farrar, Straus and Giroux, who became his publisher.

Merton began an 18th-century English literature course during the spring semester taught by Mark Van Doren, a professor with whom he maintained a lifetime friendship.

In January 1938, Merton graduated from Columbia with a B.A. in English. In June, his friend Seymour Freedgood arranged a meeting with Mahanambrata Brahmachari, a Hindu monk visiting New York from the University of Chicago. Merton was impressed by him, believing the monk was profoundly centered in God. While Merton expected Brahmachari to recommend Hinduism, instead he advised Merton to reconnect with the spiritual roots of his own culture. He suggested Merton read The Confessions of Augustine and The Imitation of Christ. Merton read them both.

Merton decided to explore Catholicism further. Finally, in August 1938, he decided to attend Mass and went to Corpus Christi Church, located near the Columbia campus on West 121st Street in Morningside Heights. The ritual of Mass was foreign to him, but he listened attentively. Following this, Merton began to read more extensively in Catholicism.

On November 16, 1938, Thomas Merton underwent the rite of baptism at Corpus Christi Church and received Holy Communion. On February 22, 1939, Merton received his M.A. in English from Columbia University. Merton decided he would pursue his PhD at Columbia and moved from Douglaston to Greenwich Village.

Monastic life

On December 10, 1941, Thomas Merton arrived at the Abbey of Gethsemani and spent three days at the monastery guest house, waiting for acceptance into the Order. The novice master would come to interview Merton, gauging his sincerity and qualifications. In the interim, Merton was put to work polishing floors and scrubbing dishes. On December 13 he was accepted into the monastery as a postulant by Frederic Dunne, Gethsemani's abbot since 1935. Merton's first few days did not go smoothly. He had a severe cold from his stay in the guest house, where he sat in front of an open window to prove his sincerity. During his initial weeks at Gethsemani, Merton studied the complicated Cistercian sign language and daily work and worship routine.

In March 1942, during the first Sunday of Lent, Merton was accepted as a novice at the monastery. In June, he received a letter from his brother John Paul stating he was soon to leave for the war and would be coming to Gethsemani to visit before leaving. On July 17 John Paul arrived in Gethsemani and the two brothers did some catching up. John Paul expressed his desire to become Catholic, and by July 26 was baptized at a church in nearby New Haven, Kentucky, leaving the following day. This would be the last time the two saw each other. John Paul died on April 17, 1943, when his plane failed over the English Channel. A poem by Merton to John Paul appears in The Seven Storey Mountain.

Writer
Merton kept journals throughout his stay at Gethsemani. Initially, he felt writing to be at odds with his vocation, worried it would foster a tendency to individuality. But his superior, Dunne, saw that Merton had both a gifted intellect and talent for writing. In 1943 Merton was tasked to translate religious texts and write biographies on the saints for the monastery. Merton approached his new writing assignment with the same fervor and zeal he displayed in the farmyard.

On March 19, 1944, Merton made his temporary profession of vows and was given the white cowl, black scapular and leather belt. In November 1944 a manuscript Merton had given to friend Robert Lax the previous year was published by James Laughlin at New Directions: a book of poetry titled Thirty Poems. Merton had mixed feelings about the publishing of this work, but Dunne remained resolute over Merton continuing his writing. In 1946 New Directions published another poetry collection by Merton, A Man in the Divided Sea, which, combined with Thirty Poems, attracted some recognition for him. The same year Merton's manuscript for The Seven Storey Mountain was accepted by Harcourt Brace & Company for publication. The Seven Storey Mountain, Merton's autobiography, was written during two-hour intervals in the monastery scriptorium as a personal project.

By 1947 Merton was more comfortable in his role as a writer. On March 19 he took his solemn vows, a commitment to live out his life at the monastery. He also began corresponding with a Carthusian at St. Hugh's Charterhouse in England. Merton had harbored an appreciation for the Carthusian Order since coming to Gethsemani in 1941, and would later come to consider leaving the Cistercians for that Order. On July 4 the Catholic journal Commonweal published an essay by Merton titled Poetry and the Contemplative Life.

In 1948 The Seven Storey Mountain was published to critical acclaim, with fan mail to Merton reaching new heights. Merton also published several works for the monastery that year, which were: Guide to Cistercian Life, Cistercian Contemplatives, Figures for an Apocalypse, and The Spirit of Simplicity. That year Saint Mary's College (Indiana) also published a booklet by Merton, What Is Contemplation? Merton published as well that year a biography, Exile Ends in Glory: The Life of a Trappistine, Mother M. Berchmans, O.C.S.O. Merton's abbot, Dunne, died on August 3, 1948, while riding on a train to Georgia. Dunne's passing was painful for Merton, who had come to look on the abbot as a father figure and spiritual mentor. On August 15 the monastic community elected Dom James Fox, a former US Navy officer, as their new abbot. In October Merton discussed with him his ongoing attraction to the Carthusian and Camaldolese Orders and their eremitical way of life, to which Fox responded by assuring Merton that he belonged at Gethsemani. Fox permitted Merton to continue his writing, Merton now having gained substantial recognition outside the monastery. On December 21 Merton was ordained as a subdeacon. From 1948 on, Merton identified himself as an anarchist.

On January 5, 1949, Merton took a train to Louisville and applied for American citizenship. Published that year were Seeds of Contemplation, The Tears of Blind Lions, The Waters of Siloe, and the British edition of The Seven Storey Mountain under the title Elected Silence. On March 19, Merton became a deacon in the Order, and on May 26 (Ascension Thursday) he was ordained a priest, saying his first Mass the following day. In June, the monastery celebrated its centenary, for which Merton authored the book Gethsemani Magnificat in commemoration. In November, Merton started teaching mystical theology to novices at Gethsemani, a duty he greatly enjoyed. By this time Merton was a huge success outside the monastery, The Seven Storey Mountain having sold over 150,000 copies. In subsequent years Merton would author many other books, amassing a wide readership. He would revise Seeds of Contemplation several times, viewing his early edition as error-prone and immature. A person's place in society, views on social activism, and various approaches toward contemplative prayer and living became constant themes in his writings.

In this particularly prolific period of his life, Merton is believed to have been suffering from a great deal of loneliness and stress. One incident indicative of this is the drive he took in the monastery's jeep, during which Merton, acting in a possibly manic state, erratically slid around the road and almost caused a head-on collision.

During long years at Gethsemani, Merton changed from the passionately inward-looking young monk of The Seven Storey Mountain to a more contemplative writer and poet. Merton became well known for his dialogues with other faiths and his non-violent stand during the race riots and Vietnam War of the 1960s.

By the 1960s, he had arrived at a broadly human viewpoint, one deeply concerned about the world and issues like peace, racial tolerance, and social equality. He had developed a personal radicalism which had political implications but was not based on ideology, rooted above all in non-violence. He regarded his viewpoint as based on "simplicity" and expressed it as a Christian sensibility. His New Seeds of Contemplation was published in 1961. In a letter to Nicaraguan Catholic priest, liberation theologian and politician Ernesto Cardenal (who entered Gethsemani but left in 1959 to study theology in Mexico), Merton wrote: "The world is full of great criminals with enormous power, and they are in a death struggle with each other. It is a huge gang battle, using well-meaning lawyers and policemen and clergymen as their front, controlling papers, means of communication, and enrolling everybody in their armies."

Merton finally achieved the solitude he had long desired while living in a hermitage on the monastery grounds in 1965. Over the years he had occasional battles with some of his abbots about not being allowed out of the monastery despite his international reputation and voluminous correspondence with many well-known figures of the day.

At the end of 1968, the new abbot, Flavian Burns, allowed him the freedom to undertake a tour of Asia, during which he met the Dalai Lama in India on three occasions, and also the Tibetan Buddhist Dzogchen master Chatral Rinpoche, followed by a solitary retreat near Darjeeling, India. In Darjeeling, he befriended Tsewang Yishey Pemba, a prominent member of the Tibetan community. Then, in what was to be his final letter, he noted, "In my contacts with these new friends, I also feel a consolation in my own faith in Christ and in his dwelling presence. I hope and believe he may be present in the hearts of all of us."

Merton's role as a writer is explored in novelist Mary Gordon's On Merton (2019).

Personal life 

According to The Seven Storey Mountain, the youthful Merton loved jazz, but by the time he began his first teaching job he had forsaken all but peaceful music. Later in life, whenever he was permitted to leave Gethsemani for medical or monastic reasons, he would catch what live jazz he could, mainly in Louisville or New York.

In April 1966, Merton underwent surgery to treat debilitating back pain. While recuperating in a Louisville hospital, he fell in love with Margie Smith, a student nurse assigned to his care. (He referred to her in his diary as "M.") He wrote poems to her and reflected on the relationship in "A Midsummer Diary for M." Merton struggled to maintain his vows while being deeply in love. It is not known if he ever consummated the relationship.

Death
On December 10, 1968, Merton was at a Red Cross retreat facility named Sawang Kaniwat in Samut Prakan, a province near Bangkok, Thailand, attending a monastic conference. After giving a talk at the morning session, he was found dead later in the afternoon in the room of his cottage, wearing only shorts, lying on his back with a short-circuited Hitachi floor fan lying across his body. His associate, Jean Leclercq, states: "In all probability the death of Thomas Merton was due in part to heart failure, in part to an electric shock." Since there was no autopsy, there was no suitable explanation for the wound in the back of Merton's head, "which had bled considerably." Arriving from the cottage next to Merton's, the Primate of the Benedictine Order and presiding officer of the conference, Rembert Weakland, anointed Merton.

His body was flown back to the United States on board a US military aircraft returning from Vietnam. He is buried at the Gethsemani Abbey.

In 2018, Hugh Turley and David Martin published The Martyrdom of Thomas Merton: An Investigation, questioning the theory of accidental electrocution.

Spirituality beyond Catholicism

Eastern religions
Merton was first exposed to and became interested in Eastern religions when he read Aldous Huxley's Ends and Means in 1937, the year before his conversion to Catholicism. Throughout his life, he studied Buddhism, Confucianism, Taoism, Hinduism, Sikhism, Jainism, and Sufism in addition to his academic and monastic studies.

While Merton was not interested in what these traditions had to offer as doctrines and institutions, he was deeply interested in what each said of the depth of human experience. He believed that for the most part, Christianity had forsaken its mystical tradition in favor of Cartesian emphasis on "the reification of concepts, idolization of the reflexive consciousness, flight from being into verbalism, mathematics, and rationalization." Eastern traditions, for Merton, were mostly untainted by this type of thinking and thus had much to offer in terms of how to think of and understand oneself.

Merton was perhaps most interested in—and, of all of the Eastern traditions, wrote the most about—Zen. Having studied the Desert Fathers and other Christian mystics as part of his monastic vocation, Merton had a deep understanding of what it was those men sought and experienced in their seeking. He found many parallels between the language of these Christian mystics and the language of Zen philosophy.

In 1959, Merton began a dialogue with D. T. Suzuki which was published in Merton's Zen and the Birds of Appetite as "Wisdom in Emptiness". This dialogue began with the completion of Merton's The Wisdom of the Desert. Merton sent a copy to Suzuki with the hope that he would comment on Merton's view that the Desert Fathers and the early Zen masters had similar experiences. Nearly ten years later, when Zen and the Birds of Appetite was published, Merton wrote in his postface that "any attempt to handle Zen in theological language is bound to miss the point", calling his final statements "an example of how not to approach Zen." Merton struggled to reconcile the Western and Christian impulse to catalog and put into words every experience with the ideas of Christian apophatic theology and the unspeakable nature of the Zen experience.

In keeping with his idea that non-Christian faiths had much to offer Christianity in experience and perspective and little or nothing in terms of doctrine, Merton distinguished between Zen Buddhism, an expression of history and culture, and Zen. What Merton meant by Zen Buddhism was the religion that began in China and spread to Japan as well as the rituals and institutions that accompanied it. By Zen, Merton meant something not bound by culture, religion or belief. In this capacity, Merton was influenced by Aelred Graham's book Zen Catholicism of 1963. With this idea in mind, Merton's later writings about Zen may be understood to be coming more and more from within an evolving and broadening tradition of Zen which is not particularly Buddhist but informed by Merton's monastic training within the Christian tradition.

American Indian spirituality
Merton also explored American Indian spirituality. He wrote a series of articles on American Indian history and spirituality for The Catholic Worker, The Center Magazine, Theoria to Theory, and Unicorn Journal. He explored themes such as American Indian fasting and missionary work.

Legacy

Merton's influence has grown since his death, and he is widely recognized as an important 20th-century Catholic mystic and thinker. Interest in his work contributed to a rise in spiritual exploration beginning in the 1960s and 1970s in the United States. Merton's letters and diaries reveal the intensity with which their author focused on social justice issues, including the civil rights movement and proliferation of nuclear arms. He had prohibited their publication for 25 years after his death. Publication raised new interest in Merton's life.

The Abbey of Gethsemani benefits from the royalties of Merton's writing. In addition, his writings attracted much interest in Catholic practice and thought, and in the Cistercian vocation.

In recognition of Merton's close association with Bellarmine University, the university established an official repository for Merton's archives at the Thomas Merton Center on the Bellarmine campus in Louisville, Kentucky.

The Thomas Merton Award, a peace prize, has been awarded since 1972 by the Thomas Merton Center for Peace and Social Justice in Pittsburgh, Pennsylvania.

The 2015, in tribute to the centennial year of Merton's birth, The Festival of Faiths in Louisville Kentucky honored his life and work with Sacred Journey’s the Legacy of Thomas Merton.

An annual lecture in his name is given at his alma mater, Columbia University in which the Columbia chaplaincy invites a prominent Catholic to speak.

The campus ministry building at St. Bonaventure University, the school where Merton taught English briefly between graduating from Columbia University with his M.A. in English and entering the Trappist Order, is named after him. St. Bonaventure University also holds an important repository of Merton materials worldwide.

Bishop Marrocco/Thomas Merton Catholic Secondary School in downtown Toronto, Ontario, Canada, which was formerly named St. Joseph's Commercial and was founded by the Sisters of St. Joseph, is named in part after him.

Some of Merton's manuscripts that include correspondence with his superiors are located in the library of the Monastery of the Holy Spirit in Conyers, Georgia. Antony Theodore has provided details of his encounters with Asian spiritual leaders and the influence of Confucianism, Taoism, Zen Buddhism and Hinduism on Merton's mysticism and philosophy of contemplation.

Merton was one of four Americans mentioned by Pope Francis in his speech to a joint meeting of the United States Congress on September 24, 2015. Francis said, "Merton was above all a man of prayer, a thinker who challenged the certitudes of his time and opened new horizons for souls and for the Church. He was also a man of dialogue, a promoter of peace between peoples and religions."

Sacred Heart University in Fairfield, Connecticut, has a residence hall named after him, called Thomas Merton Hall.

In popular culture
Merton's life was the subject of The Glory of the World, a play by Charles L. Mee. Roy Cockrum, a former monk who won the Powerball lottery in 2014, helped finance the production of the play in New York. Prior to New York the play was being shown in Louisville, Kentucky.

In the movie First Reformed, written and directed by Paul Schrader, Ethan Hawke's character (a middle-aged Protestant reverend) is influenced by Merton's work.

Thomas Merton was portrayed briefly by Adam Kilgour as a character in the movie Quiz Show.

Singer and songwriter Judy Collins wrote and recorded a song about Thomas Merton in 2022. It is part of her setlist while touring in 2023.

Church musician Ray W. Urwin composed a hymn tune he named "Thomas Merton", setting a text by Carl P. Daw Jr. which begins "Surely it is God who saves me" (hymn #679 in The Hymnal 1982 of the Episcopal Church (United States)).

See also
 List of peace activists
 List of works about Thomas Merton
 Thomas Merton bibliography

Notes

References

Further reading
 2019 - Gordon, Mary, On Merton (2019), Shambhala Publications, 
 2018 - Turley, Hugh and David Martin, The Martyrdom of Thomas Merton (2018), McCabe, 
 2017 - Merton, Thomas and Paul M. Pearson. Beholding Paradise: The Photographs of Thomas Merton. Paulist Press.
 2015 - Lipsey, Roger. Make Peace before the Sun Goes Down: The Long Encounter of Thomas Merton and His Abbot, James Fox. Boulder, CO. Shambhala Publications 
 2014 - Shaw, Jeffrey M. Illusions of Freedom: Thomas Merton and Jacques Ellul on Technology and the Human Condition. Eugene, OR: Wipf and Stock. .
 2014 - Horan, Daniel. The Franciscan Heart of Thomas Merton: A New Look at the Spiritual Inspiration of His Life, Thought, and Writing Notre Dame: Ave Maria Press. (2014). 
 2008 – Graham, Terry, 2008, SUFI: a journal of Sufism, Issue 30.
 2007 – Deignan, Kathleen, A Book of Hours: At Prayer With Thomas Merton (2007), Sorin Books, .
 2006 – Weis, Monica, Paul M. Pearson, Kathleen P. Deignan, Beyond the Shadow and the Disguise: Three Essays on Thomas Merton (2006), The Thomas Merton Society of Great Britain and Ireland, .
 2003 – Merton, Thomas, Kathleen Deignan Ed., John Giuliani, Thomas Berry, When The Trees Say Nothing (2003), Sorin Books, .
 2002 – Shannon, William H., Christine M. Bochen, Patrick F. O'Connell The Thomas Merton Encyclopedia (2002), Orbis Books, .
 1997 – Merton, Thomas, "Learning to Love", The Journals of Thomas Merton, Volume Six 1966-1967(1997), . (see notes for page numbers)
 1993 - Theodore, Antony, Thomas Merton's Mystical Quest for Union with God (1993), Ventura Verlaghaus, 
 1992 – Shannon, William H., Silent Lamp: The Thomas Merton Story (1992), The Crossroad Publishing Company, biography.
 1991 – Forest, Jim, Living With Wisdom: A Life of Thomas Merton (revised edition) (2008), Orbis Books, illustrated biography.
 1984 – Mott, Michael, The Seven Mountains of Thomas Merton (1984), Harvest Books 1993: , authorized biography.
 1978 – Merton, Thomas, The Seven Storey Mountain (1978), A Harvest/HBJ Book, . (see notes for page numbers)

External links

Finding aid to the Thomas Merton papers at Columbia University Rare Book & Manuscript Library
 
 
 
 Thomas Merton Archives at St. Bonaventure University

1915 births
1968 deaths
20th-century American poets
20th-century American Roman Catholic priests
20th-century Christian mystics
Accidental deaths by electrocution
Accidental deaths in Thailand
Alumni of Clare College, Cambridge
American anti-war activists
American autobiographers
American Christian monks
American Christian pacifists
American environmentalists
American feminists
American people of New Zealand descent
American people of the Vietnam War
American Roman Catholic poets
American spiritual teachers
Bellarmine University people
British emigrants to the United States
Buddhist and Christian interfaith dialogue
Burials in Kentucky
Catholics from Kentucky
Catholic pacifists
Roman Catholic mystics
Christian humanists
Christian radicals
Cistercian mystics
Columbia College (New York) alumni
Columbia Graduate School of Arts and Sciences alumni
Converts to Roman Catholicism from Anglicanism
Ecofeminists
Male feminists
People educated at Oakham School
People from Pyrénées-Orientales
People from Nelson County, Kentucky
St. Bonaventure University faculty
Trappists
Venerated Catholics by Pope Francis
Writers from Kentucky
20th-century American essayists
French people of New Zealand descent
French emigrants to the United States
French people of American descent
Nonviolence advocates
Poet priests
Traditionalist School